William Browder (born January 6, 1934) is an American mathematician, specializing in algebraic topology, differential topology and differential geometry. Browder was one of the pioneers with Sergei Novikov, Dennis Sullivan and C. T. C. Wall of the surgery theory method for classifying high-dimensional manifolds. He served as president of the American Mathematical Society until 1990.

Life and career
William Browder was born in New York City in 1934, the son of Raisa (née Berkmann), a Jewish Russian woman from Saint Petersburg, and American Communist Party leader Earl Browder, from Wichita, Kansas. His father had moved to the Soviet Union in 1927, where he met and married Raisa. Their sons Felix Browder and Andrew Browder (born 1931) were both born there. He attended local schools. He graduated from the Massachusetts Institute of Technology with a B.S. degree in 1954 and received his Ph.D. from Princeton University in 1958, with a dissertation entitled Homology of Loop Spaces, advised by John Coleman Moore.

Since 1964 Browder has been a professor at Princeton University; he was chair of the mathematics department at Princeton from 1971 to 1973. He was editor of the journal Annals of Mathematics from 1969 to 1981, and president of the American Mathematical Society from 1989 to 1991.

Browder was elected to the United States National Academy of Sciences in 1980, the American Academy of Arts and Sciences in 1984, and the Finnish Society of Sciences and Letters in 1990. In 1994 a conference was held at Princeton in celebration of his 60th birthday. In 2012 a conference was held at Princeton on the occasion of his retirement.

Selected bibliography
Books
"Surgery on Simply-Connected Manifolds", Ergebnisse der Mathematik und ihrer Grenzgebiete, vol. 65, Springer-Verlag, Berlin (1972)
"Algebraic Topology and Algebraic K-Theory", Princeton University Press, 1987, 

Seminal papers
"Homotopy Type of Differentiable Manifolds", Proc. 1962 Aarhus Conference, published in Proc. 1993
Oberwolfach Novikov Conjecture Conference proceedings, London Mathematical Society Lecture Notes 226 (1995)
"The Kervaire invariant of framed manifolds and its generalization", Annals of Mathematics 90, 157–186 (1969)

See also
 Assembly map
 Exotic sphere
 Kervaire invariant
 Normal invariant
 Signature (topology)
 Surgery exact sequence
 Earl Browder, father
 Felix Browder, brother
 Andrew Browder, brother
 Bill Browder, nephew
 Joshua Browder, grandnephew

References

External links

William Browder (AMS brief bio)
Browder, William, "My life in mathematics: How I became a mathematician and the milestones of my career" (2012 video)

1934 births
20th-century American mathematicians
21st-century American mathematicians
Fellows of the American Academy of Arts and Sciences
Living people
American people of Russian-Jewish descent
Massachusetts Institute of Technology School of Science alumni
Members of the United States National Academy of Sciences
Presidents of the American Mathematical Society
Princeton University alumni
Princeton University faculty
Topologists
William